Winsum is a railway station located in Winsum, The Netherlands. The station was opened on 16 August 1893 and is located on the Sauwerd–Roodeschool railway. The train services are operated by Arriva.

Services

Trains
The following services currently call at Winsum:
2x per hour local service (stoptrein) Groningen - Roodeschool

Buses
These services are operated by Qbuzz:
 65 - Zoutkamp - Ulrum - Leens - Wehe-den Hoorn - Eenrum - Mensingweer - Winsum - Sauwerd - Adorp - Groningen (Hourly)
 67 - Winsum - Mensingweer - Eenrum - Wehe den Hoorn - Kloosterbeuren - Hornhuizen (Hourly, only during rush hours)
 165 - Groningen - Adorp - Sauwerd - Winsum - Mensingeweer - Wehe-den Hoorn - Leens - Ulrum - Zoutkamp (Hourly, only during rush hours)

These services are operated by UVO:
 36 - Winsum - Garnwerd - Feerwerd - Ezinge - Saaksum - Oldehove (Hourly)
 68 - Winsum - Baflo - Den Andel - Westernieland - Pieterburen - Molenrij - Kloosterburen -Kruisweg -Hornhuizen - Leens (Hourly)

This service is operated by Arriva:
 665 - Winsum - Sauwerd - Adorp - Groningen, Zernike Campus (1x per day)

Service 163 (Qbuzz) from Groningen via Lauwersoog to Holwerd used to stop at the station, but since 2011 it skips the station.

Accidents and incidents

On 25 July 1980, two passenger trains were in a head-on collision near Winsum. Nine people were killed, 21 were injured.
On 19 November 2016, a passenger train was in collision with a milk lorry on a level crossing near Winsum and was derailed. Eighteen people were injured, three seriously.

References

External links
 Winsum station, station information

Transport in Het Hogeland
Railway stations in Groningen (province)
Railway stations opened in 1893